Complejo Municipal San Juan Opico is a sports complex which local soccer team Juventud Independiente use as their home field in the Primera Division de Futbol Professional in El Salvador. The stadium's maximum capacity is estimated at about 5,000.

Football venues in El Salvador